Holbrookia elegans, the elegant earless lizard, is a species of lizard native to the United States and Mexico.

Description
The tail length is longer than the body's.

References

Holbrookia
Lizards of North America
Reptiles described in 1874